Hossein Ebrahimi (born March 5, 1990) is an Iranian footballer who currently plays for Zob Ahan of the Persian Gulf Pro League as a midfielder.

Club career
Joined Pegah youth system in 2005. He starts to play in Iran Pro League when he was 17 years old in 2007. In the beginning of 2008–09 season Pegah was sold and change its name to Damash. After playing two seasons for the club he had to leave Damash to Malavan for military services, He had a good season with Malavan in his first year and played in most of games, but was mostly benched on the 2010–11 season due injury.

On 15 May 2013, he signed a three-year contract with Naft Tehran.

Club career statistics
Last Update: April 27, 2015

Honours

Club
Foolad
Hazfi Cup: 2020–21

International
Iran
WAFF Championship: 2008

References

Iran Premier League Stats

1990 births
Living people
Iranian footballers
Pegah Gilan players
Damash Gilan players
Malavan players
Iran under-20 international footballers
Naft Tehran F.C. players
Association football midfielders
Naft Masjed Soleyman F.C. players
Sportspeople from Gilan province